Hydnellum regium is a tooth fungus in the family Bankeraceae. Found in western North America, it was described as new to science in 1964 by Canadian mycologist Kenneth A. Harrison, who reported collections from Oregon, Idaho, and Colorado. It fruits singly or in groups under pine and spruce trees.

The spore print is brown. Its spores are roughly spherical, tuberculate (covered with rounded bumps), and measure 4.5–6 by 3.5–4.5 µm.

References

External links

Fungi described in 1964
Fungi of North America
Inedible fungi
regium